Bozataw (Karakalpak: Бозатаў районы, Bozataw rayonı, formerly Qazanketken) is an urban-type settlement in Karakalpakstan in Uzbekistan. It is the seat of Bozataw district.

References

Populated places in Karakalpakstan
Urban-type settlements in Uzbekistan